Ali Hashemi (Persian/Arabic: علی هاشمی), commonly known as "Shahid Ali Hashemi" is among the Iranian commanders during Iran–Iraq War. He was born in 1961 in Ahwaz. This Iranian Arab commander who got married in 1984 (1363 S.H.) and had a son and a daughter, was appointed as the commander of "the 6th army of Imam Sadiq" in 1987, and he managed several brigades, divisions (military), Basij (The Organization for Mobilization of the Oppressed) and Khuzestan/Lorestan Sepah (Islamic Revolutionary Guard Corps), and likewise was appointed as the commander of "Nosrat secret headquarters" at the third year of the war by Mohsen Rezaee.

A part of Ali Hashemi's testament is as follows:

O' the martyr-productive nation of Iran, we went; but we put its duty on each one of you; you always keep our blood alive till Islam be alive. And you, the Iranian prolific youth of Hezbollah, although I swiftly went towards the believed at a young age ...

Ali Hashemi who was well known as "Sardar-e-Hoor" (Sardar (IRGC) of Marsh), eventually was killed in 1988 along with a group of Iranian fighters among Mehdi Narimi in Majnoon Island, and his body came back to Iran after 22 years.

See also
 Ahmad Kazemi
 Mehdi Bakeri
 Mehdi Zeinoddin
 Mohammad Ebrahim Hemmat

References

Ahwazi Arabs
People from Ahvaz
Muslims killed in battle
Islamic Revolutionary Guard Corps personnel of the Iran–Iraq War
Iranian military personnel killed in the Iran–Iraq War
1961 births
1988 deaths